is a Japanese anime director, known for directing series such as Rumic Theater, Gallery Fake, Petopeto-san, Hitohira, Zombie-Loan, and three Battle Spirits television series.

Works

References

External links

Living people
Anime directors
People from Miyazaki Prefecture
Osaka University of Arts alumni
Year of birth missing (living people)